The Roman Catholic Relief Act 1813 (53 Geo. III, c. 128) was an Act of the Parliament of the United Kingdom. The Act allowed Irish Roman Catholics in England to be elected to all corporations; hold all civil and military offices except the very highest; to a certain extent keep arms; and were allowed to vote. This was all provided they took the Oath of Allegiance and a new oath abjuring certain doctrines. This had previously been granted to them in Ireland by the Catholic Relief Act 1793 passed by the pre-Union Parliament of Ireland.

The Act has been repealed.

References

United Kingdom Acts of Parliament 1813
Repealed United Kingdom Acts of Parliament
Law about religion in the United Kingdom
1813 in Christianity